F.C. Catacumba is a Bissau-Guinean football club based in Canchungo. They play in the 2 division in Guinean football, the Campeonato Nacional da Guine-Bissau.

Catacumba